The Beaver Creek Ranger Station near Rimrock, Arizona was built in 1935 by the Civilian Conservation Corps.  It was designed by architects of the U.S. Forest Service. It was listed on the National Register of Historic Places on June 10, 1993, for its architecture, which is of Bungalow/Craftsman style.  It served historically as institutional housing and as government office space.  The NRHP listing was for three contributing buildings and two other contributing structures on a  area.

It includes a ranger station office, a ranger residence, and a barn/garage/shop building.

References

United States Forest Service ranger stations
Buildings and structures in Yavapai County, Arizona
Civilian Conservation Corps in Arizona
Park buildings and structures on the National Register of Historic Places in Arizona
National Register of Historic Places in Yavapai County, Arizona
Government buildings completed in 1935
1935 establishments in Arizona